An Internet Locator Server (abbreviated ILS) is a server that acts as a directory for Microsoft NetMeeting clients. An ILS is not necessary within a local area network and some wide area networks in the Internet because one participant can type in the IP address of the other participant's host and call them directly. An ILS becomes necessary when one participant is trying to contact a host who has a private IP address internal to a local area network that is inaccessible to the outside world, or when the host is blocked by a firewall. An ILS is also useful when a participant has a different IP address during each session, e.g., assigned by the Dynamic Host Configuration Protocol.

There are two main approaches to using Internet Location Servers: use a public server on the Internet, or run and use a private server.

Private Internet Location Server
The machine running an Internet Location Server must have a public IP address.
If the network running an Internet Location Server has a firewall, it is usually necessary to run the server in the demilitarized zone of the network.

Microsoft Windows includes an Internet Location Server. It can be installed in the Control Panel using Add/Remove Windows Components, under "Networking Services" (Site Server ILS Services).

The Internet Location Server (ILS) included in Microsoft Windows 2000 offers service on port 1002, while the latest version of NetMeeting requests service from port 389. The choice of 1002 was to avoid conflict with Windows 2000's domain controllers, which use LDAP and Active Directory on port 389, as well as Microsoft Exchange Server 2000, which uses port 389. If the server is running neither Active Directory nor Microsoft Exchange Server, the Internet Location Server's port can be changed to 389 using the following command at a command prompt:

 ILSCFG [servername] /port 389

Additional firewall issues
Internet Location Servers do not address two other issues with using NetMeeting behind a firewall. First, although a participant can join the directory from an external IP address, the participant cannot join a meeting unless the internal host manually adds the participant to the meeting from the directory. Second, while this approach is fine for data conferencing, audio or video conferencing requires opening of a wide range of ports on the firewall. In this case, it may be desirable to use a gateway.

See also
User Location Service
LDAP

Windows communication and services